James Patrick Keith (September 21, 1949 - September 7, 1999) was an American author and conspiracy theorist, best known for the books Black Helicopters Over America and The Octopus, co-written with Kenn Thomas, detailing theories around the death of reporter Danny Casolaro.  After starting his career with writing and editing the zines Dharma Combat and Notes from the Hangar, as well as contributing articles to Fate Magazine, Keith became an editor at Steamshovel Press.  He also authored 12 books covering topics such as mind control, the New World Order, black helicopters, the Oklahoma City bombing, Illuminati and Men in Black.  Keith died at Washoe Medical Center in Reno at age 49, following a fall at the Burning Man festival.

Early Life 
Jim Keith became interested in UFOs and the occult from age 7, writing short stories and articles at age 10.  Growing up, the 6’4” self-described radical libertarian considered himself a member of the 1960s counterculture.  After avoiding the Vietnam War draft as a conscientious objector, he left Haight-Ashbury and hitchhiked to Klamath Falls in 1972.  There he worked as a newspaper publisher, cable TV salesman, restaurant worker and at a lumber mill.  He also contributed to small publications on Science Fiction, New Age and conspiracy topics.

Writing 
Moving to Reno with his parents in 1980, Keith gained custody of his two daughters and home-schooled them.  During this time, he worked out of the home on writing projects to make money, writing 6 hours a day.  His first published work was The Gemstone File, written in three months and accepted by IllumiNet Press with a $250 advance.  One week later, his work Secret and Suppressed was accepted by Feral House with a $500 advance.

Keith was also a member of the writing collective called Commander X, covering subjects such as free energy, the Philadelphia Experiment and alien conspiracies.

Death and Controversy 
On September 6, 1999, Keith injured his leg after stepping off a three-foot stage at the Burning Man festival.  Thinking it was only a severe sprain, he went home.  The next morning, he checked into the Washoe Medical center for treatment of a broken knee.  Surgery was delayed due to issues with kidney function.  At 8:10 PM on Tuesday, September 7, 1999, a blood clot released from his leg and entered his lung, an issue which proved fatal.

In an article published three weeks after Keith’s death, friends and co-authors expressed suspicion that he was killed because he mentioned the name of a physician who declared Princess Diana was pregnant at the time of her death.

The coroner’s record of death stated the following:
 Manner of death: "Accident"
 Cause of death "FALL FROM HEIGHT"
 Due to: "PULMONARY EMBOLISM"
 Due to: "RIGHT TIBIAL FRACTURE"
 Due to: "BLUNT FORCE TRAUMA (FALL)"

Books 
 Gemstone File (1992). .
 Secret and Suppressed: Banned Ideas and Hidden History. Venice, Calif.: Feral House (1993). .
 Black Helicopters over America: Strikeforce for the New World Order (1994). .
 Casebook on Alternative 3: UFOs, Secret Societies and World Control (1994). .
 Saucers of the Illuminati, published under pseudonym Jay Katz (1995). .
 The Octopus: Secret Government and the Death of Danny Casolaro, with Kenn Thomas (1996). .
 Okbomb! Conspiracy and Cover-Up (1996). .
 Casebook on the Men in Black (1997). .
 Mind Control, World Control: The Encyclopedia of Mind Control. Adventures Unlimited Press (1997). .
 Black Helicopters II: The End Game Strategy (1998). .
 Biowarfare In America. Lilburn, GA: Illuminet Press (1999). .
 Mass Control: Engineering Human Consciousness (2003). .

Articles 

 A Gemstone Darkly; Steamshovel Press #4 (1992)
 Whose Saucers Are They?; Steamshovel Press #5 (1992)
 Virtually Reality (Column); Steamshovel Press #7 (1993)
 Virtually Reality (Column); Steamshovel Press #9 (1993)
 Virtually Reality (Column); Steamshovel Press #10 (1994)
 Virtually Reality: Oklahoma City, Turn Right (Column); Steamshovel Press #14 (1995)
 UFOs at the Edge of Reality (1995 lecture); Paranoia Magazine (2016)
 The Octopus: Wild Rumors (Book Excerpt); Steamshovel Press #15 (1996)
 Princess Diana Was Pregnant: Fayed's Physician Examined Her; Nitro News (1999)
 Subverting Sex: Sex Experiments of Alfred Kinsey; Nitro News (1999)
 Take $250 and an Implant: Company Foreshadows Future; Nitro News (1999)
 Evidence of Device on Plane: Kennedy was Treading on Israeli Ground; Nitro News (1999)
 The Biggest Secret: The Book that will Change the World, by David Icke (book review); The Konformist (1999)

References

External Links 

 The Tarot Card Incident, personal note from Larry Parr (1999)
 The First Days, personal note from Jim Schumacher (1999)
 Burning Down the House, personal note from Dwain Kaiser (2000)
 Jim Keith, Burning Man and Wounded Knee, by Adam Gorightly in Steamshovel Press #18 (2000)
 Dimly Visible Through a Fog of Evasions: In Memory of a Friend, by Wayne Henderson in Steamshovel Press #17 (2000)
 Comments from friends and fans
 A collection of audio and video interviews from 1996-2000, including appearances with Art Bell and Jeff Rense

American conspiracy theorists
1949 births
1999 deaths
American writers